The German Design Council (German: Rat für Formgebung) is a non-profit organisation with the aim of representing the interests of German companies focussed on design. The foundation has more than 300 members today in industry, design, associations and institutions.

History 
The German Design Council was founded in the wake of the harsh criticism of the presentation of German products from the post-war period at the New York export trade show in 1949. In accordance with a motion of the Social Democratic Party (SPD), the German Bundestag decided to create an independent council for design development. This council was founded in 1953 as the '' in the form of a nonprofit foundation with the explicit task of supporting German industry in developing design as an economic and cultural factor. Since then, the Council has carried out its duties by organising exhibitions, competitions and conferences, producing publications and providing strategic consulting. The logo of the German Design Council was created in 1960 by the graphic designer Anton Stankowski (1906–1998). The German Design Council pursues a design approach focussed on creating cultural and economic values. As formulated in the foundation resolution of the German Bundestag, the meeting of the foundation members functions as a platform for the communication of everyone involved in the design process.

Activities (selection) 

 From 1969 to 2001: Gute Form (Good Design), presented on behalf of the German Federal Ministry for Economics
 From 2002 to 2012: Designpreis der Bundesrepublik Deutschland (German Design Award), presented on behalf of the German Federal Ministry for Economics
 Since 2012: German Design Awards
 Since 2013: Iconic Awards
 Since 2016: German Brand Awards 
 Since 2009: German Brand and Design Congress
Library

References

Further reading

External links 
 Official Website
 German Design Awards 
German Design Council Library

German design
Foundations based in Germany
1953 establishments in Germany